Kenia Moreta Pérez (born April 7, 1981 in Santo Domingo) is a retired volleyball player from the Dominican Republic, who competed for her native country at the 2004 Summer Olympics in Athens, Greece, wearing the number #16 jersey.

There she ended up in eleventh place with the Dominican Republic women's national team. Moreta played as a middle-blocker. She claimed the gold medal with the national squad at the 2003 Pan American Games.

She played during the 2004–2005 for the Italian team Burro Virgilio Gabbioli Curtatone from the A2 Italian Series.

For the 2007–2008 season, she played for the Japanese professional team Denso Airybees.

Clubs
  Mirador (2003–2004)
  Bameso (2005)
  Burro Virgilio Gabbioli Curtatone (2004–2005)
  Denso Airybees (2007–2008)

References

External links
 FIVB biography

1981 births
Living people
Dominican Republic women's volleyball players
Volleyball players at the 2004 Summer Olympics
Olympic volleyball players of the Dominican Republic
Volleyball players at the 2003 Pan American Games
Volleyball players at the 2007 Pan American Games
Pan American Games gold medalists for the Dominican Republic
Pan American Games medalists in volleyball
Central American and Caribbean Games gold medalists for the Dominican Republic
Competitors at the 2002 Central American and Caribbean Games
Competitors at the 2006 Central American and Caribbean Games
Expatriate volleyball players in Italy
Expatriate volleyball players in Japan
Dominican Republic expatriate sportspeople in Italy
Dominican Republic expatriate sportspeople in Japan
Central American and Caribbean Games medalists in volleyball
Medalists at the 2003 Pan American Games